Arctia forsteri is a moth in the family Erebidae. It was described by Franz Daniel in 1943. It is found in Sichuan, China.

The species of the genus Sinoarctia , including this one, were moved to Arctia as a result of phylogenetic research published by Rönkä et al. in 2016.

References

Moths described in 1943
Arctiina